

Peerage of England

|Duke of Cornwall (1337)||none||1537||1603||
|-
|rowspan="2"|Duke of Norfolk (1483)||Thomas Howard, 3rd Duke of Norfolk||1553||1554||Restored; died
|-
|Thomas Howard, 4th Duke of Norfolk||1554||1572||
|-
|rowspan="2"|Duke of Suffolk (1514)||Henry Brandon, 2nd Duke of Suffolk||1545||1551||Died
|-
|Charles Brandon, 3rd Duke of Suffolk||1551||1551||Died, title extinct
|-
|Duke of Somerset (1547)||Edward Seymour, 1st Duke of Somerset||1514||1545||Attainted, and his titles were forfeited
|-
|Duke of Northumberland (1551)||John Dudley, 1st Duke of Northumberland||1551||1553||New creation; attainted and his honours were forfeited
|-
|Duke of Suffolk (1551)||Henry Grey, 1st Duke of Suffolk||1551||1554||New creation; also Marquess of Dorset; attainted and his honours were forfeited
|-
|Marquess of Northampton (1547)||William Parr, 1st Marquess of Northampton||1547||1571||Attainted 1554, restored 1559
|-
|Marquess of Winchester (1551)||William Paulet, 1st Marquess of Winchester||1551||1572||New creation; created Earl of Wiltshire in 1550
|-
|Earl of Arundel (1138)||Henry FitzAlan, 19th Earl of Arundel||1544||1580||
|-
|Earl of Oxford (1142)||John de Vere, 16th Earl of Oxford||1540||1562||
|-
|Earl of Westmorland (1397)||Henry Neville, 5th Earl of Westmorland||1459||1564||
|-
|Earl of Shrewsbury (1442)||Francis Talbot, 5th Earl of Shrewsbury||1538||1560||
|-
|Earl of Kent (1465)||Henry Grey, 4th Earl of Kent||1524||1562||
|-
|Earl of Derby (1485)||Edward Stanley, 3rd Earl of Derby||1521||1572||
|-
|Earl of Worcester (1514)||William Somerset, 3rd Earl of Worcester||1549||1589||
|-
|Earl of Cumberland (1525)||Henry Clifford, 2nd Earl of Cumberland||1542||1570||
|-
|Earl of Rutland (1525)||Henry Manners, 2nd Earl of Rutland||1543||1563||
|-
|Earl of Huntingdon (1529)||Francis Hastings, 2nd Earl of Huntingdon||1544||1561||
|-
|rowspan="2"|Earl of Sussex (1529)||Henry Radclyffe, 2nd Earl of Sussex||1542||1553||Died
|-
|Thomas Radclyffe, 3rd Earl of Sussex||1557||1583||
|-
|Earl of Bath (1536)||John Bourchier, 2nd Earl of Bath||1539||1561||
|-
|rowspan="2"|Earl of Southampton (1547)||Thomas Wriothesley, 1st Earl of Southampton||1547||1550||Died
|-
|Henry Wriothesley, 2nd Earl of Southampton||1550||1581||
|-
|rowspan="2"|Earl of Warwick (1547)||John Dudley, 1st Earl of Warwick||1547||1553||Created Duke of Northumberland in 1551, see above; attainted in 1553
|-
|John Dudley, 2nd Earl of Warwick||1553||1553||Restored; died, title extinct
|-
|rowspan="2"|Earl of Bedford (1550)||John Russell, 1st Earl of Bedford||1550||1555||New creation, died
|-
|Francis Russell, 2nd Earl of Bedford||1555||1585||
|-
|Earl of Pembroke (1551)||William Herbert, 1st Earl of Pembroke||1551||1570||New creation
|-
|rowspan="3"|Earl of Devon (1553)||Edward Courtenay, 1st Earl of Devon||1553||1556||New creation; on his death the title was considered extinct, until 1831
|-
|William Courtenay, de jure 2nd Earl of Devon||1556||1557||
|-
|William Courtenay, de jure 3rd Earl of Devon||1557||1630||
|-
|Earl of Northumberland (1557)||Thomas Percy, 7th Earl of Northumberland||1557||1572||New creation
|-
|Earl of Hertford (1557)||Edward Seymour, 1st Earl of Hertford||1559||1621||New creation
|-
|rowspan="2"|Viscount Hereford (1550)||Walter Devereux, 1st Viscount Hereford||1550||1558||New creation; died
|-
|Walter Devereux, 2nd Viscount Hereford||1558||1576||
|-
|Viscount Montagu (1554)||Anthony Browne, 1st Viscount Montagu||1554||1592||New creation
|-
|Viscount Howard of Bindon (1559)||Thomas Howard, 1st Viscount Howard of Bindon||1559||1582||New creation
|-
|Baron Grey de Wilton (1295)||William Grey, 13th Baron Grey de Wilton||1520||1562||
|-
|Baron Clinton (1299)||Edward Clinton, 9th Baron Clinton||1517||1585||
|- 
|Baron De La Warr (1299)||Thomas West, 9th Baron De La Warr||1525||1554||Died, Barony fell into abeyance
|- 
|Baron Ferrers of Chartley (1299)||Walter Devereux, 10th Baron Ferrers of Chartley||1501||1558||Created Viscount Hereford, Barony held by his heirs until 1646, when it fell into abeyance
|- 
|rowspan="2"|Baron Morley (1299)||Henry Parker, 10th Baron Morley||1518||1556||Died
|- 
|Henry Parker, 11th Baron Morley||1556||1577||
|- 
|rowspan="3"|Baron Zouche of Haryngworth (1308)||John la Zouche, 8th Baron Zouche||1526||1550||Died
|- 
|Richard la Zouche, 9th Baron Zouche||1550||1552||Died
|- 
|George la Zouche, 10th Baron Zouche||1552||1569||
|- 
|rowspan="2"|Baron Audley of Heleigh (1313)||John Tuchet, 8th Baron Audley||1512||1557||Died
|- 
|George Tuchet, 9th Baron Audley||1557||1560||
|- 
|rowspan="2"|Baron Cobham of Kent (1313)||George Brooke, 9th Baron Cobham||1529||1558||Died
|- 
|William Brooke, 10th Baron Cobham||1558||1597||
|- 
|Baron Willoughby de Eresby (1313)||Catherine Willoughby, 12th Baroness Willoughby de Eresby||1526||1580||
|- 
|Baron Dacre (1321)||Gregory Fiennes, 10th Baron Dacre||1558||1594||Attainder reversed
|- 
|Baron Greystock (1321)||William Dacre, 7th Baron Greystoke||1516||1563||
|- 
|Baron Bourchier (1342)||Anne Bourchier, 7th Baroness Bourchier||1540||1571||
|- 
|Baron Scrope of Bolton (1371)||Henry Scrope, 9th Baron Scrope of Bolton||1549||1591||
|- 
|Baron Bergavenny (1392)||Henry Nevill, 6th Baron Bergavenny||1536||1585||
|- 
|Baron Berkeley (1421)||Henry Berkeley, 7th Baron Berkeley||1534||1613||
|- 
|Baron Latimer (1432)||John Neville, 4th Baron Latimer||1543||1577||
|- 
|rowspan="2"|Baron Dudley (1440)||John Sutton, 3rd Baron Dudley||1532||1553||Died
|- 
|Edward Sutton, 4th Baron Dudley||1553||1586||
|- 
|Baron Saye and Sele (1447)||Richard Fiennes, 6th Baron Saye and Sele||1528||1573||
|- 
|rowspan="2"|Baron Stourton (1448)||Charles Stourton, 8th Baron Stourton||1548||1557||Died
|- 
|John Stourton, 9th Baron Stourton||1557||1588||
|- 
|Baron Ogle (1461)||Robert Ogle, 6th Baron Ogle||1545||1562||
|- 
|Baron Mountjoy (1465)||James Blount, 6th Baron Mountjoy||1544||1582||
|- 
|Baron Grey of Powis (1482)||Edward Grey, 3rd Baron Grey of Powis||1504||1552||Died, Barony fell into abeyance
|- 
|Baron Willoughby de Broke (1491)||Elizabeth Willoughby, 3rd Baroness Willoughby de Broke||1535||1562||
|- 
|Baron Conyers (1509)||John Conyers, 3rd Baron Conyers||1538||1557||Died, title fell into abeyance until 1641, when it was confirmed to the Baron Darcy de Knyath
|- 
|Baron Monteagle (1514)||Thomas Stanley, 2nd Baron Monteagle||1523||1560||
|-
|rowspan="2"|Baron Vaux of Harrowden (1523)||Thomas Vaux, 2nd Baron Vaux of Harrowden||1523||1556||Died
|-
|William Vaux, 3rd Baron Vaux of Harrowden||1556||1595||
|-
|Baron Sandys of the Vine (1529)||Thomas Sandys, 2nd Baron Sandys||1540||1560||
|-
|Baron Braye (1529)||John Braye, 2nd Baron Braye||1539||1557||Died, Barony fell into abeyance until 1839
|-
|rowspan="2"|Baron Burgh (1529)||Thomas Burgh, 1st Baron Burgh||1529||1550||Died
|-
|William Burgh, 2nd Baron Burgh||1550||1584||
|-
|Baron Tailboys (1529)||Elizabeth Tailboys, 4th Baroness Tailboys of Kyme||1542||1563||
|-
|rowspan="2"|Baron Windsor (1529)||William Windsor, 2nd Baron Windsor||1543||1558||Died
|-
|Edward Windsor, 3rd Baron Windsor||1558||1574||
|-
|rowspan="2"|Baron Wentworth (1529)||Thomas Wentworth, 1st Baron Wentworth||1529||1551||Died
|-
|Thomas Wentworth, 2nd Baron Wentworth||1551||1584||
|-
|Baron Mordaunt (1532)||John Mordaunt, 1st Baron Mordaunt||1532||1562||
|-
|Baron St John of Basing (1539)||William Paulet, 1st Baron St John of Basing||1539||1572||Created Marquess of Winchester, see above
|-
|Baron Russell (1540)||John Russel, 1st Baron Russell||1540||1555||Created Earl of Bedford, see above; Barony held by his heirs
|-
|rowspan="2"|Baron Cromwell (1540)||Gregory Cromwell, 1st Baron Cromwell||1540||1551||Died
|-
|Henry Cromwell, 2nd Baron Cromwell||1551||1593||
|-
|Baron Eure (1544)||William Eure, 2nd Baron Eure||1548||1594||
|-
|Baron Wharton (1545)||Thomas Wharton, 1st Baron Wharton||1545||1568||
|-
|Baron Sheffield (1547)||John Sheffield, 2nd Baron Sheffield||1549||1568||
|-
|Baron Rich (1547)||Richard Rich, 1st Baron Rich||1547||1567||
|-
|Baron Willoughby of Parham (1547)||William Willoughby, 1st Baron Willoughby of Parham||1547||1570||
|-
|Baron Lumley (1547)||John Lumley, 1st Baron Lumley||1547||1609||
|-
|rowspan="2"|Baron Darcy of Aston (1548)||George Darcy, 1st Baron Darcy of Aston||1548||1558||Died
|-
|John Darcy, 2nd Baron Darcy of Aston||1558||1602||
|-
|rowspan="2"|Baron Darcy of Chiche (1551)||Thomas Darcy, 1st Baron Darcy of Chiche||1551||1558||New creation
|-
|John Darcy, 2nd Baron Darcy of Chiche||1558||1581||
|-
|Baron Paget (1552)||William Paget, 1st Baron Paget||1552||1563||New creation
|-
|Baron North (1554)||Edward North, 1st Baron North||1554||1564||New creation
|-
|Baron Howard of Effingham (1554)||William Howard, 1st Baron Howard of Effingham||1554||1573||New creation
|-
|Baron Williams of Thame (1554)||John Williams, 1st Baron Williams of Thame||1554||1559||New creation; died, Barony fell into abeyance
|-
|rowspan="2"|Baron Chandos (1554)||John Brydges, 1st Baron Chandos||1554||1557||New creation, died
|-
|Edmund Brydges, 2nd Baron Chandos||1557||1573||
|-
|Baron Hastings of Loughborough (1558)||Edward Hastings, 1st Baron Hastings of Loughborough||1558||1572||New creation
|-
|Baron Hunsdon (1559)||Henry Carey, 1st Baron Hunsdon||1559||1596||New creation
|-
|Baron St John of Bletso (1559)||Oliver St John, 1st Baron St John of Bletso||1559||1582||New creation
|-
|}

Peerage of Scotland

|Duke of Rothesay (1398)||none||1541||1566||
|-
|Earl of Sutherland (1235)||John Gordon, 11th Earl of Sutherland||1535||1567||
|-
|rowspan=3|Earl of Angus (1389)||Archibald Douglas, 6th Earl of Angus||1513||1557||Died
|-
|David Douglas, 7th Earl of Angus||1557||1558||
|-
|Archibald Douglas, 8th Earl of Angus||1558||1588||
|-
|rowspan=2|Earl of Crawford (1398)||David Lindsay, 9th Earl of Crawford||1542||1558||
|-
|David Lindsay, 10th Earl of Crawford||1558||1574||
|-
|Earl of Menteith (1427)||John Graham, 4th Earl of Menteith||1543||1565||
|-
|Earl of Huntly (1445)||George Gordon, 4th Earl of Huntly||1524||1562||
|-
|Earl of Erroll (1452)||George Hay, 7th Earl of Erroll||1541||1573||
|-
|Earl of Caithness (1455)||George Sinclair, 4th Earl of Caithness||1529||1582||
|-
|rowspan=2|Earl of Argyll (1457)||Archibald Campbell, 4th Earl of Argyll||1529||1558||Died
|-
|Archibald Campbell, 5th Earl of Argyll||1558||1573||
|-
|Earl of Atholl (1457)||John Stewart, 4th Earl of Atholl||1542||1579||
|-
|Earl of Morton (1458)||James Douglas, 4th Earl of Morton||1550||1581||
|-
|rowspan=2|Earl of Rothes (1458)||George Leslie, 4th Earl of Rothes||1513||1558||Died
|-
|Andrew Leslie, 5th Earl of Rothes||1558||1611||
|-
|Earl Marischal (1458)||William Keith, 4th Earl Marischal||1530||1581||
|-
|rowspan=2|Earl of Buchan (1469)||John Stewart, 3rd Earl of Buchan||1505||1551||Died
|-
|Christina Stewart, 4th Countess of Buchan||1551||1580||
|-
|Earl of Glencairn (1488)||Alexander Cunningham, 5th Earl of Glencairn||1541||1574||
|-
|rowspan=2|Earl of Bothwell (1488)||Patrick Hepburn, 3rd Earl of Bothwell||1513||1556||Died
|-
|James Hepburn, 4th Earl of Bothwell||1556||1567||
|-
|Earl of Lennox (1488)||Matthew Stewart, 4th Earl of Lennox||1526||1571||
|-
|Earl of Arran (1503)||James Hamilton, 2nd Earl of Arran||1529||1575||
|-
|Earl of Montrose (1503)||William Graham, 2nd Earl of Montrose||1513||1571||
|-
|Earl of Eglinton (1507)||Hugh Montgomerie, 3rd Earl of Eglinton||1546||1585||
|-
|rowspan=2|Earl of Cassilis (1509)||Gilbert Kennedy, 3rd Earl of Cassilis||1527||1558||Died
|-
|Gilbert Kennedy, 4th Earl of Cassilis||1558||1576||
|-
|rowspan=2|Lord Erskine (1429)||John Erskine, 5th Lord Erskine||1513||1552||de jure Earl of Mar; died
|-
|John Erskine, 6th Lord Erskine||1552||1572||de jure Earl of Mar
|-
|Lord Somerville (1430)||James Somerville, 6th Lord Somerville||1549||1569||
|-
|Lord Haliburton of Dirleton (1441)||Janet Haliburton, 7th Lady Haliburton of Dirleton||1502||1560||
|-
|Lord Forbes (1442)||William Forbes, 7th Lord Forbes||1547||1593||
|-
|rowspan=3|Lord Maxwell (1445)||Robert Maxwell, 6th Lord Maxwell||1546||1553||Died
|-
|Robert Maxwell, 7th Lord Maxwell||1553||1555||Died
|-
|John Maxwell, 8th Lord Maxwell||1555||1593||
|-
|rowspan=2|Lord Glamis (1445)||John Lyon, 7th Lord Glamis||1528||1558||Died
|-
|John Lyon, 8th Lord Glamis||1558||1578||
|-
|Lord Lindsay of the Byres (1445)||John Lindsay, 5th Lord Lindsay||1526||1563||
|-
|Lord Saltoun (1445)||Alexander Abernethy, 6th Lord Saltoun||1543||1587||
|-
|Lord Gray (1445)||Patrick Gray, 4th Lord Gray||1541||1584||
|-
|Lord Sinclair (1449)||William Sinclair, 4th Lord Sinclair||1513||1570||
|-
|rowspan=2|Lord Fleming (1451)||James Fleming, 4th Lord Fleming||1547||1558||Died
|-
|John Fleming, 5th Lord Fleming||1558||1572||
|-
|Lord Seton (1451)||George Seton, 7th Lord Seton||1549||1586||
|-
|Lord Borthwick (1452)||John Borthwick, 5th Lord Borthwick||1542||1566||
|-
|rowspan=2|Lord Boyd (1454)||Robert Boyd, 4th Lord Boyd||Aft. 1508||1558||Died
|-
|Robert Boyd, 5th Lord Boyd||1558||1590||
|-
|Lord Oliphant (1455)||Laurence Oliphant, 3rd Lord Oliphant||1516||1566||
|-
|rowspan=2|Lord Livingston (1458)||Alexander Livingston, 5th Lord Livingston||1518||1553||Died
|-
|William Livingstone, 6th Lord Livingston||1553||1592||
|-
|Lord Cathcart (1460)||Alan Cathcart, 4th Lord Cathcart||1547||1618||
|-
|rowspan=2|Lord Lovat (1464)||Alexander Fraser, 4th Lord Lovat||1544||1558||Died
|-
|Hugh Fraser, 5th Lord Lovat||1558||1577||
|-
|Lord Innermeath (1470)||John Stewart, 4th Lord Innermeath||1532||1569||
|-
|Lord Carlyle of Torthorwald (1473)||Michael Carlyle, 4th Lord Carlyle||1526||1575||
|-
|Lord Home (1473)||Alexander Home, 5th Lord Home||1549||1575||
|-
|rowspan=2|Lord Ruthven (1488)||William Ruthven, 2nd Lord Ruthven||1528||1552||Died
|-
|Patrick Ruthven, 3rd Lord Ruthven||1552||1566||
|-
|rowspan=2|Lord Crichton of Sanquhar (1488)||William Crichton, 5th Lord Crichton of Sanquhar||1536||1550||Died
|-
|Robert Crichton, 6th Lord Crichton of Sanquhar||1550||1561||
|-
|Lord Drummond of Cargill (1488)||David Drummond, 2nd Lord Drummond||1519||1571||
|-
|rowspan=2|Lord Hay of Yester (1488)||John Hay, 4th Lord Hay of Yester||1543||1557||Died
|-
|William Hay, 5th Lord Hay of Yester||1557||1586||
|-
|rowspan=2|Lord Sempill (1489)||William Sempill, 2nd Lord Sempill||1513||1552||Died
|-
|Robert Sempill, 3rd Lord Sempill||1552||1576||
|-
|Lord Herries of Terregles (1490)||Agnes Maxwell, 4th Lady Herries of Terregles||1543||1594||
|-
|Lord Ogilvy of Airlie (1491)||James Ogilvy, 5th Lord Ogilvy of Airlie||1549||1606||
|-
|rowspan=2|Lord Ross (1499)||Ninian Ross, 3rd Lord Ross||1513||1556||Died
|-
|James Ross, 4th Lord Ross||1556||1581||
|-
|Lord Elphinstone (1509)||Robert Elphinstone, 3rd Lord Elphinstone||1547||1602||
|-
|rowspan=2|Lord Methven (1528)||Henry Stewart, 1st Lord Methven||1528||1552||Died
|-
|Henry Stewart, 2nd Lord Methven||1552||1572||
|-
|Lord Ochiltree (1543)||Andrew Stewart, 2nd Lord Ochiltree||1548||1591||
|-
|}

Peerage of Ireland

|Earl of Ormond (1328)||Thomas Butler, 10th Earl of Ormond||1546||1614||
|-
|rowspan=2|Earl of Desmond (1329)||James FitzGerald, 14th Earl of Desmond||1540||1558||Died
|-
|Gerald FitzGerald, 14th Earl of Desmond||1558||1582||
|-
|Earl of Waterford (1446)||Francis Talbot, 5th Earl of Waterford||1538||1560||
|-
|rowspan=2|Earl of Tyrone (1542)||Conn O'Neill, 1st Earl of Tyrone||1542||1559||Died
|-
|Brien O'Neill, 2nd Earl of Tyrone||1559||1562||
|-
|Earl of Clanricarde (1543)||Richard Burke, 2nd Earl of Clanricarde||1544||1582||
|-
|rowspan=3|Earl of Thomond (1543)||Murrough O'Brien, 1st Earl of Thomond||1543||1551||Died
|-
|Donough O'Brien, 2nd Earl of Thomond||1551||1553||Died
|-
|Connor O'Brien, 3rd Earl of Thomond||1553||1581||
|-
|Earl of Kildare (1554)||Gerald FitzGerald, 1st Earl of Kildare||1554||1585||New creation
|-
|Viscount Gormanston (1478)||Jenico Preston, 3rd Viscount Gormanston||1532||1569||
|-
|rowspan=4|Viscount Buttevant (1541)||John FitzJohn Barry, 1st Viscount Buttevant||1541||1553||Died
|-
|Edmund FitzJohn Barry, 2nd Viscount Buttevant||1553||1556||Died
|-
|James FitzJohn Barry, 3rd Viscount Buttevant||1556||1557||Died
|-
|James de Barry, 4th Viscount Buttevant||1557||1581||
|-
|Viscount Baltinglass (1541)||Rowland Eustace, 2nd Viscount Baltinglass||1549||1578||
|-
|Viscount Mountgarret (1550)||Richard Butler, 1st Viscount Mountgarret||1550||1571||New creation
|-
|Baron Athenry (1172)||Richard II de Bermingham||1547||1580||
|-
|Baron Kingsale (1223)||Gerald de Courcy, 17th Baron Kingsale||1535||1599||
|-
|rowspan=2|Baron Kerry (1223)||Gerard Fitzmaurice, 15th Baron Kerry||1549||1550||Died
|-
|Thomas Fitzmaurice, 16th Baron Kerry||1550||1590||
|-
|Baron Slane (1370)||James Fleming, 9th Baron Slane||1517||1578||
|-
|rowspan=2|Baron Howth (1425)||Richard St Lawrence, 7th Baron Howth||1549||1558||Died
|-
|Christopher St Lawrence, 8th Baron Howth||1558||1589||
|-
|rowspan=3|Baron Killeen (1449)||John Plunkett, 5th Baron Killeen||1510||1550||Died
|-
|Patrick Plunkett, 6th Baron Killeen||1550||1556||Died
|-
|Christopher Plunkett, 7th Baron Killeen||1556||1567||
|-
|Baron Trimlestown (1461)||Patrick Barnewall, 4th Baron Trimlestown||1538||1562||
|-
|rowspan=2|Baron Dunsany (1462)||Robert Plunkett, 5th Baron of Dunsany||1521||1559||Died
|-
|Christopher Plunkett, 6th Baron of Dunsany||1559||1564||
|-
|rowspan=2|Baron Delvin (1486)||Richard Nugent, 5th Baron Delvin||1537||1559||Died
|-
|Christopher Nugent, 6th Baron Delvin||1559||1602||
|-
|Baron Power (1535)||John Power, 3rd Baron Power||1545||1592||
|-
|Baron Dunboyne (1541)||Edmond Butler, 1st Baron Dunboyne||1541||1566||
|-
|rowspan=2|Baron Louth (1541)||Oliver Plunkett, 1st Baron Louth||1541||1555||Died
|-
|Thomas Plunkett, 2nd Baron Louth||1555||1571||
|-
|Baron Carbery (1541)||Edward de Bermingham, 2nd Baron Carbery||1548||1550||Died, title extinct
|-
|Baron Upper Ossory (1541)||Barnaby Fitzpatrick, 1st Baron Upper Ossory||1541||1575||
|-
|rowspan=2|Baron Inchiquin (1543)||Dermod O'Brien, 2nd Baron Inchiquin||1551||1557||Title previously held by the Earl of Thomond; died
|-
|Murrough McDermot O'Brien, 3rd Baron Inchiquin||1557||1574||
|-
|rowspan=2|Baron Cahir (1543)||Thomas Butler, 1st Baron Cahir||1543||1558||Died
|-
|Thomas Butler, 1st Baron Cahir||1543||1558||
|-
|Baron Dunboyne (1541)||Edmond Butler, 1st Baron Dunboyne||1541||1566||
|-
|rowspan=2|Baron Louth (1541)||Oliver Plunkett, 1st Baron Louth||1541||1555||Died
|-
|Thomas Plunkett, 2nd Baron Louth||1555||1571||
|-
|Baron Carbery (1541)||Edward de Bermingham, 2nd Baron Carbery||1548||1550||Died; title extinct
|-
|Baron Upper Ossory (1541)||Barnaby Fitzpatrick, 1st Baron Upper Ossory||1541||1575||
|-
|rowspan=2|Baron Inchiquin (1543)||Dermod O'Brien, 2nd Baron Inchiquin||1551||1557||Barony previously held by the 1st Earl of Thomond; died
|-
|Murrough McDermot O'Brien, 3rd Baron Inchiquin||1557||1573||
|-
|rowspan=2|Baron Cahir (1543)||Thomas Butler, 1st Baron Cahir||1543||1558||Died
|-
|Edmund Butler, 2nd Baron Cahir||1558||1560||
|-
|Baron Ballyane (1553)||Cahir mac Art Kavanagh||1553||1555||New creation, for life; died, title extinct
|-
|Baron Ballyane (1555)||Dermot mac Cahir Kavanagh||1555||1559||New creation, for life; died, title extinct
|-
|}

References

 

Lists of peers by decade
1550s in England
1550s in Ireland
16th century in England
16th century in Scotland
16th century in Ireland
16th-century English nobility
16th-century Scottish peers
16th-century Irish people
Peers